Abraham Lincoln – also known as The Gettysburg Lincoln – is a bronze statue of President Abraham Lincoln by Daniel Chester French, located on the grounds of the Nebraska State Capitol. The monument was commissioned by the Abraham Lincoln Memorial Association of Lincoln, Nebraska, and produced in 1912. 

The statue was cast in bronze by Jno. Williams, Inc. of New York. Its architectural setting was created by French's longtime collaborator Henry Bacon. The 8.67 ft (2.64 m) statue stands upon a 6 ft (1.83 m) granite base and before a 20 ft (6.1 m) granite stele, on which is inscribed the text of Lincoln's Gettysburg Address.

French later used much of his research for this statue – consisting largely of studying Mathew Brady's photographs of Lincoln and obtaining a copy of Leonard Volk's plaster life cast of the president – in the creation of his most famous work: the Lincoln statue (1920) at the Lincoln Memorial in Washington, D.C.

See also
 List of statues of Abraham Lincoln
 List of sculptures of presidents of the United States

References

External links
 
 The Gettysburg Lincoln from Smithsonian Institution Research Information System.

1912 establishments in Nebraska
1912 sculptures
Bronze sculptures in Nebraska
Monuments and memorials to Abraham Lincoln in the United States
Sculptures by Daniel Chester French
Sculptures of men in Nebraska
Statues in Nebraska
Lincoln, Nebraska